is a district located in Chiba Prefecture, Japan. As of August 2010, the district had an estimated population of 8,992 and a density of 198 persons per km2. Awa District at present consists only of the town of Kyonan

History
Awa District was one of the ancient districts of Kazusa Province, and originally covered all of the southern end of Bōsō Peninsula. In 718, it was separated from Kazusa to become the separate province of Awa, which existed to the Meiji Restoration of 1868.

At the time of its formation, Awa District consisted of 93 hamlets, divided evenly between Tateyama Domain and Nagao Domain. These were consolidated into two towns (Tateyama and Hōjō, which merged with Tateyama in 1993) and nine villages. In 1897, three districts of Asai, Hei and Nagasa were absorbed into Awa District, at which time Awa District expanded to seven towns and 37 villages. Subsequently, Awa District has been gradually reduced in size through the formation of cities, and at present consists only of the town of Kyonan.

Mergers

On February 11, 2005 the town of Amatsukominato merged into the city Kamogawa.
On March 20, 2006 the towns of Chikura, Maruyama, Shirahama, Tomiura, Tomiyama and Wada, and the village of Miyoshi merged to form the new city of Minamibōsō.

References

Bibliography

Counties of Japan

Districts in Chiba Prefecture